The 1912 United States presidential election in Nevada took place on November 5, 1912, as part of the 1912 United States presidential election. Voters chose three representatives, or electors to the Electoral College, who voted for president and vice president.

Nevada was won by Woodrow Wilson with 39.7% of the vote. Theodore Roosevelt followed with 27.94%, Eugene V. Debs 16.47%, and Taft 15.89%. Nevada, along with Arizona, Florida, Louisiana, and Mississippi, were the only states where Debs came in third place or better.

Results

Results by county

See also
United States presidential elections in Nevada

Notes

References

1912 Nevada elections
Nevada
1912